100 Great Detectives is a book written by Maxim Jakubowski. Its original title was  100 Great Detectives or the Detective Directory and was published by Carroll & Graf Publishers on 1 January 1991. 

100 Great Detectives  later went on to win the Anthony Award for Best Critical Work in 1992.

References 

Anthony Award-winning works
Detective fiction
Detective novels
Carroll & Graf books